Lucas Nahuel Castro (born 9 April 1989) is an Argentine professional footballer who plays for Sarmiento, as a winger.

Club career

Gimnasia La Plata
Castro began his career within the youth ranks of Argentine club Gimnasia y Esgrima La Plata in 2003.

After 68 appearances and 6 goals for his hometown club, Castro transferred to Racing Club de Avellaneda.

Racing Club
In July 2011, Castro completed a transfer to Argentine rivals Racing Club de Avellaneda after being signed by Manager Diego Simeone. Castro played mainly on the left wing and Mauro Camoranesi usually playing on the right wing. In his only season with the club, he scored 6 goals in 29 league appearances.

Calcio Catania
On 20 July 2012, Castro signed for Italian Serie A club Catania for €2.5 million on a five-year contract.

Chievo Verona
On 29 June 2015, Castro signed with Chievo.

Cagliari
On 30 June 2018, Castro signed with Cagliari.

SPAL
On 31 January 2020, he joined SPAL on loan. As certain performance conditions were met, SPAL were obligated to purchase his rights.

Turkey
On 19 January 2021, Castro signed with Turkish club Fatih Karagümrük. In August 2021 he moved to Adana Demirspor.

International career
In 2011, Castro was called up to the Argentina national side by the then manager Alejandro Sabella for a friendly match against Brazil.

Career statistics

Club

References

External links
 Argentine Primera statistics at Fútbol XXI  
 goal.com
 calciocatania.it (Lucas Nahuel Castro, scatto e dribbling)

1989 births
Living people
Footballers from La Plata
Argentine footballers
Association football wingers
Club de Gimnasia y Esgrima La Plata footballers
Racing Club de Avellaneda footballers
Catania S.S.D. players
A.C. ChievoVerona players
Cagliari Calcio players
S.P.A.L. players
Fatih Karagümrük S.K. footballers
Adana Demirspor footballers
Argentine Primera División players
Serie A players
Serie B players
Süper Lig players
Argentine expatriate footballers
Argentine expatriate sportspeople in Italy
Expatriate footballers in Italy
Argentine expatriate sportspeople in Turkey
Expatriate footballers in Turkey
Club Atlético Sarmiento footballers